Antipino is a rural locality (a village) in Vokhtozhskoye Rural Settlement, Gryazovetsky District, Vologda Oblast, Russia. The population was 5 as of 2002.

Geography 
Antipino is located 62 km southeast of Gryazovets (the district's administrative centre) by road. Vokhtoga is the nearest rural locality.

References 

Rural localities in Gryazovetsky District